Marko Myyry (born 15 November 1967) is a Finnish former footballer who played as a midfielder.

Career
Myyry joined 2. Bundesliga side SV Meppen in 1987. He would appear for the club in nearly 400 matches (175 matches in the 2. Bundesliga) over two spells from 1987 to 2001.

Myyry made several appearances for the Finland national football team.

References

External links
 
 Finland – International Player Records
 Profile & stats - Lokeren

1967 births
Living people
Finnish footballers
Finnish expatriate footballers
Finland international footballers
FC Haka players
K.S.C. Lokeren Oost-Vlaanderen players
SV Meppen players
2. Bundesliga players
Mestaruussarja players
Association football midfielders
Expatriate footballers in Germany
Expatriate footballers in Belgium
People from Kerava
Sportspeople from Uusimaa